The Campeonato Sul-Mato-Grossense Série C was the third level of football league of the state of Mato Grosso do Sul, Brazil. It was played only once, in 2008, and had the participation of teams from the amateur level in addition to affiliates who were not up to date with the federation fees.

Format

40 clubs divided in 10 groups of 4. The 10 groups champions and the 6 better second places advanced to the Round of 16. The final phase was played in two legs with the aways goal rule.

List of champions

References